Chalciporus rubinellus, commonly known as the purple-red bolete, is a bolete fungus of the family Boletaceae. It was first described in 1879 as Boletus rubinellus, and later transferred to the genus Chalciporus in 1973.

Genetically it is closely related to Chalciporus amarellus.

See also
List of North American boletes

References

External links

Chalciporus
Fungi of North America
Fungi described in 1879
Taxa named by Charles Horton Peck